The High Court of Delhi (IAST: dillī uchcha nyāyālaya) was established on 31 October 1966, through the Delhi High Court Act, 1966, with four judges, Chief Justice K. S. Hegde, Justice I. D. Dua, Justice H. R. Khanna and Justice S. K. Kapur. The High Court currently has a sanctioned strength of 45 permanent judges and 15 additional judges.

History
In 1882, the High Court of Judicature at Lahore was established with jurisdiction over the provinces of Punjab and Delhi. This jurisdiction lasted until 1947 and the Partition of India.

The High Courts (Punjab) Order, 1947 established a new High Court for the province of East Punjab with effect from 15 August 1947. The 'India (Adaptation of Existing Indian Laws) Order, 1947' provided that any reference in existing Indian law to the High Court of Judicature at Lahore be replaced by a reference to the High Court of East Punjab.

The High Court of East Punjab functioned from the Peterhoff in Shimla until it was moved to Chandigarh, along with the secretariat of the Punjab government in 1954-55. The High Court of Punjab, as it later came to be called, exercised jurisdiction over Delhi through a Circuit Bench which dealt with the cases pertaining to the Union Territory of Delhi and the Delhi Administration.

In view of the importance of Delhi, its population and other considerations, the Indian Parliament, by enacting the Delhi High Court Act, 1966, and established the High Court of Delhi effective from 31 October 1966. By virtue of Section 3(1) of the Delhi High Court Act, the Central Government was empowered to appoint a date by notification in the official gazette, establishing a High Court for the Union Territory of Delhi. The appointed date was 31 October 1966.

The High Court of Delhi initially exercised jurisdiction not only over the Union Territory of Delhi but also Himachal Pradesh. The High Court of Delhi had a Himachal Pradesh Bench at Shimla in a building called Ravenswood. The High Court of Delhi continued to exercise jurisdiction over Himachal Pradesh until the State of Himachal Pradesh Act, 1970 came into force on 25 January 1971.

Current Judges of Delhi HC 
Following is the list of sitting Judges including Chief Justice of High Court of Delhi:

Original Side Civil Jurisdiction 
The High Court of Delhi is  territory. This means that civil cases can be filed directly in the High Court, whereas the High Court generally only has appellate civil jurisdiction otherwise. The other High Courts which have original side jurisdiction are Bombay, Calcutta, Madras, and Himachal Pradesh.

Backlog
As per the report released on 2006–08, Delhi High court has a long list of pending cases. The backlog is such that it would take 466 years to resolve them. In a bid to restore public trust and confidence, Delhi court spent 5 minutes per case and disposed of 94,000 cases in 2008–10.

Former Chief Justices

District Courts 

The National Capital Territory of Delhi has 7 District Courts Complex that function under the High Court of Delhi. These 7 are physical locations of the district courts, whereas actually there are 11 district courts headed by individual District Judges. The Tis Hazari complex, Rohini complex and Saket complex hosts 2 Districts each, while the Karkardooma complex hosts 3 Districts and the remaining 3 complexes (Patiala, Dwarka and Rouse Avenue) host 1 District each.

The list of 7 District Courts Complex in Delhi is as follows:

See also
 Subordinate Courts Of Delhi High Court
 High courts of India
 University of Oxford v. Rameshwari Photocopy Service

References

External links

 Official website

 
Buildings and structures in Delhi
Government of Delhi
1966 establishments in Delhi
Judiciary of India
Courts and tribunals established in 1966